The golden rhinoceros of Mapungubwe is a medieval artifact, made from wood which is covered in thin sheets of gold, from the medieval Kingdom of Mapungubwe, which is located in modern-day South Africa. It was found on a royal grave on Mapungubwe Hill in 1932 by archaeologists from the University of Pretoria. The artifact is described as being "small enough to stand in the palm of your hand."

From 26 October 2016 to 27 February 2017 it was on display at the British Museum as part of an exhibition celebrating the art of South Africa. 

The site reveals the existence of a ruling elite, living separately in a hilltop settlement. This is the first known example of a class-based society in southern Africa. This artifact shows the Mapungubwe as a wealthy trading centre.

See also
 Order of Mapungubwe
 Mapungubwe Collection

References

External links

Archaeological discoveries in South Africa
Arts in South Africa
Gold objects
Mammals in art
1932 archaeological discoveries
Archaeology of Southern Africa